The following is a list of characters from Marthandavarma, the 1891 historical novel by C. V. Raman Pillai; as well as its allusions to personalities from legends, history, and real life.

Lead Characters

Marthanda Varma (Prince) 
Marthanda Varma is also mentioned as Yuvarajavu (Prince). Marthanda Varma is described as a young man between 20 and 25 years of age with a heroic attire. He is the rightful heir to the throne after the period of king Rama Varma. He is generous towards the conspirators and shows unwillingness to take strict action against them as suggested by Ramayyan. He often disguises himself to evade the attackers. He shows great respect to Subhadra's words, pertains to which he releases Kudamon Pillai from detention, once he becomes the king.

Ananthapadmanabhan 
Ananthapadmanabhan is also mentioned as Mad Channan / The Beggar / The Diglot / Dweller of Kasi / Shamsudeen. Ananthapadmanabhan  is described as a young man of 22 years of age and an expert in disguise with superior fighting skills. He is the son of Thurumukhathu Pillai from his father's relationship with another spouse following the relationship with Kudaman Pillai's maternal niece. He is the half-brother (younger) of Subhadra. He is in love with Parukutty of Chembakassery. He has been attacked and left for dead at Panchavan forest, however after being rescued by Pathan merchants, he disguises himself as Shamsudeen as well as a mad Channan and rescues Marthanda Varma from Mangoikkal and facilitates Hakkim to help the prince. He also introduces Mangoikkal Kuruppu to the Pathan people, and helps latter to learn Hindustani language.

Subhadra 
Subhadra is also mentioned as Chembakam Akka. Subhadra is the daughter of Thirumukhathu Pillai and Kundamon Pillai's maternal niece. She is the half-sister of Ananthapadmanabhan. Subhadra is described as a woman of 25 years of age, who is as beautiful as a fairy. She was married to a relative of Kudamon Pillai, however they got separated after living together for six months as a relationship was alleged between her and Padmanabhan Thambi. She is bold and determined to take revenge on those who spoiled her marital life. She helps Marthanda Varma to escape from the plans of conspirators. She is killed by Kudamon Pillai.

Padmanabhan Thambi 
Padmanabhan Thambi is also mentioned as Shri Rayi Padmanabhan Thambi / Pappu Thambi / Thambi. Padmanabhan Thambi is the elder son of the king Rama Varma. Thambi is described as a man with well built body and fair complexion, he has an affinity to wear ornaments. He yearns for beautiful woman and has relationships with Sivakami and a paramour of Ezhamkudi (Seventh house). He wants to become the next king, after the period of his father, Rama Varma. He desires to have Subhadra and Parukutty in relationships.

Sundrayyan 
Sundrayyan is also mentioned as Pulamadan. Sunadaryyan, a man of 40 years, is the son of a Brahmin from Madurai and a Marava lady. He married the niece of Kalakkutty. He is described as main conspirator who contrives to make Thambi as the next king. He arranges the marriage proposal of Thambi to Parukutty. He is killed by Beram Khan at Manakkadu.

Parukutty 
Parukutty is also mentioned as Parvathi Amma / Parvathi Pillai / Thankam. Parukutty is the daughter of Karthyayani Amma and Ugran Kazhakkoottathu Pillai.  She is described as a beauty of 16 years of age with a considerable height.  She is slim and fair as Magnolia champaca. She has studied Mathematics, Amarakosha and Sidharoopa. She is exceptionally fluent in reciting Ramayana in her sweet voice. She is in love with Ananthapadmanabhan. Padmanabhan Thambi wanted to have a relationship with her.

Beeram Khan 
Maternal nephew of householder, who is a relative of Kudamon Pillai. He married Subhadra, with whom he breaks up after believing the false news about her relationships with other men, especially Padmanabhan Thambi. He later gets converted into Islam as Beeram Khan and marries Fathima. When Ananthapadmanabhan is found at Panchavan forest, he persuades to nurse after seeing the former's resemblance to his first wife. He kills Sundarayyan for the deeds, latter did to separate him from Subhadra.

Velu Kurup 
An ace fighter, swordsman, lancer, who is an utmost loyalist of Padmanabhan Thambi. He attacked Ananthapadmanabhan at Panchavan forest. He tries to kill Marthanda Varma at Charottu Palace, Mangoikkal house, and on the way to the palace of prince. One of his ears is sliced down by Ananthapadmanabhan, also gets killed by him at dungeon at Sree Pandarathu house.

Mangoikkal Kurup 
Mangoikkal Kurup is also mentioned as Iraviperuman Kandan Kumaran Kurup. Mangoikkal Kurup is head of Mangoikkal family. He offers shelter for Marthanda Varma and Parameswaran Pillai while evading Velu Kurup. He arranges for additional forces under his nephews to support Marthanda Varma.

Major Characters

Ettuveettil Pillai's 
 Kudaman Pillai – One of Ettuveettil Pillai's. He is the nephew of Subhadra's grandmother. He kills Subhadra and he is killed by Ananthapadmanabhan.
 Ramanamadathil Pillai – One of Ettuveettil Pillai's. He is described as the one who desires the company of Subhadra. He has a wife and a son, whom he visits only on the day of Thiruvonam.
 Kazhakkoottathu Pillai / Thevan Vikraman – One of Ettuveettil Pillai's. Intended to propose marriage with Parukutty, daughter of Ugran Kazhakkoottahtu Pillai, who was his maternal uncle. He led a force to defeat the fighters from Kilimanoor under the leadership of Narayanayyan.
 Chembazhanthi Pillai / Thevan Nandi – One of Ettuveettil Pillai's.
 Marthandan Thirumadathil Pillai – One of Ettuveettil Pillai's.
 Venganoor Pillai – One of Ettuveettil Pillai's. He and his men defeat the men from Mangoikkal supportive to prince Marthanda Varma.
 Pallichal Pillai – One of Ettuveettil Pillai's.
 Ugran Kazhakkoottathu Pillai (Deceased) – Late husband of Karthyayani Amma and father of Parukutty. He is the maternal uncle of Thevan Vikraman Kazhakkoottathu Pillai.

Parameswaran Pillai 
Parameswaran Pillai is the attendant and constant companion of the prince Marthanda Varma. When Marthanda Varma becomes the king he is promoted as the personal manager of the king.

Raman Thambi 
Shri Raman Thambi is the younger son of the king Rama Varma. He leads the Marava forces from Nanjinadu.

Thirumukhathu Pillai 
Thirumukhathu Pillai is a minister of the Kingdom. He is the father of Subhadra and Ananthapadmanabhan .

Chulliyil Chadachi Marthandan Pillai 
Chulliyil Chadachi Marthandan Pillai is an ace archer, who serves Thirumukhathu Pillai, but take sides of Ettuveetil Pillai's.

Kizhakkeveedu 
 Anantham – Maternal niece of Kalakkutty and wife of Sundarayyan.
 Kodanki / Palavesam – Elder brother of Sundarayyan. He is killed by Ananthapadmanabhan.
 Kaalakutty Pillai – Maternal uncle of Anantham and messenger of prince Marthanda Varma.

Chembakasserry 
 Karthyayani Amma / Karthyayani Pillai – Widowed wife of Ugran Kazhakkoottathu Pillai, she is the mother of Parukutty and younger sister of Chembakassery Mootha Pillai.
 Chembakasserry Mootha Pillai – Elder brother of Karthyayani Amma.
 Shanku Ashan – Caretaker of armory at Chembakassery. He is born to the previous armory care taker and a lady servant at Chembakassery.

Pathan camp 
 Fathima – Elder daughter of Hakkim's younger brother and Ayisha. Sister of Zulaikha and Nuradeen. She married Beeram Khan.
 Zulaikha – Younger daughter of Hakkim's younger brother and Ayisha. Sister of Fathima and Nuradeen. She cares for Ananthapadmanabhan as she loves him as Shamsudeen.
 Nuradeen – Son of Hakkim's younger brother and Ayisha. Brother of Fathima and Zulaikha. He marries a beautiful lady.
 Azim Ud-Dowla Khan / Hakkim – A traditional medicine specialist, who is the paternal uncle of Fathima, Nuradeen and Zulaikha. His treatment cures Anathapadmanabhan and also provides medication for king Rama Varma and Parukutty.
 Usman Khan – One who act as steward at the camp of Hakkim, who brought up him as a son from Childhood.

Royal family 
 Karthika Thirunal Rama Varma – Little prince. He is moved along with his mother to Chembakassery for protection.
 Unnamed Royal Mother – Mother of the little prince, Karthika Thirunal Rama Varma.
 Raja Rama Varma – The ailing king, who is the father of Padmanabhan Thambi and Raman Thambi. Prince Marthanda Varma refers him as maternal uncle.

Royal officials 
 Arumukham Pillai (Dalawa) – The prime minister of the kingdom. He goes to Boothapandi to make the payment for the forces from Madurai, unfortunately he had to stay there as an assurance for balance payment.
 Ramayyan (Rayasakkaran) – The ministerial official, who helps the prince during the search for Mangoikkal Kurup. He also manages to pacify the angry civilians, who entered the palace ground, by presenting the ailing king in front of the crowd.
 Narayanayyan – Royal servant who leads the men sent from Kilimanoor in support of Marthanda Varma.

Supporters of royal family 
 Kilimanoor Koithampuran (Deceased) – The one who gets killed by men of Ramanamadathil Pillai while defending the conspiracy to kill the little prince, Karthika Thirunal Rama Varma.
 Kerala Varma Koithampuran – The one who arranges additional forces for Marthanda Varma under the leadership of Narayanayyan. He guards the little prince Karthika Thirunal Rama Varma and his mother at Chembakassery.
 Aruveettukar – A powerful and rich family and their men, who are supportive to Thirumukhathu Pillai.

Mangoikkal family 
 The maternal nephews of Mangoikkal Kurup at Mangoikkal house. Some of them are follows:
 Kochu Velu – Youngest of maternal nephews of Mangoikkal Kurup.
 Krishna Kurup / Kittan – Eldest of maternal nephews of Mangoikkal Kurup.
 Narayanan – One of the maternal nephews of Mangoikkal Kurup.
 Kumaran / Komaran – One of the maternal nephews of Mangoikkal Kurup.
 Kochu Kurup / Kochannan / Cheriya Kurup – One of the maternal nephews of Mangoikkal Kurup, who was sent to Padmanabhapuram, on return from there he gets frantic by the seems-to-be-following men of Velu Kurup.
 Two of them are instructed by Mangoikkal Kurup to make arrangements for the stay of Marthanda Varma and Parameswaran Pillai.
 Six of them including Krishna Kurup and Narayanan resist Velu Kurup and attackers at Mangoikkal.
 Four of them including Krishna Kurup head to Thiruvananthapuram to lead the forces from Mangoikkal as a support to Marthanada Varma.
 Kochakkachi – Maternal niece of Mangoikkal Kurup, who instructs Kochu Velu to arrange for the morning ablutions of Marthanda Varma and Parameswaran Pillai at Mangoikkal house.
 Unnamed Ladies – The ladies of Mangoikkal house other than Kochakkachi, together with whom all are sent away to avoid any nuisance on the arrangements to safeguard Marthanada Varma and Parameswaran Pillai.

Servants of Subhadra 
 Unnamed Men – Five Nair servants, who accompany Subhadra to Chembakassery.
 Unnamed Women – Four Nair servants, who accompany Subhadra to Chembakassery.
 Shankarachar – Main Nair servant of Subhadra. He gets killed while trying to save Marthanda Varma from Velu Kurup.
 Unnamed Servant – The Nair friend of Shankarachar and the one who brings twelve servants as ordered by Subhadra to the house of Shankarachar.
 Twelve Servants – The Nair servants brought by the friend of Shankarachar.
 Pappu – A servant of Subhadra. He is sent to Padmanabhan Thambi's house to convey the false news about her death. He is sent to Sree Pandarathu house to know the about mad Channan from the guards there; he is also sent to the house of Subhadra to keep watch on the movements.
 Ten Servants – Servants who steal the particulars from the house of Anantham.
 Two among them go in search of Shankarachar in the night he is killed.
 Among them, one is stationed at Valiya Nalukettu, and one is stationed at Chembakassery to keep a watch on the movements.
 Unnamed Servant – The one who brings the medicine for Parukutty from Pathan camp and reveals about Beeram Khan.
 Five Servants – Servants who, looked like porters and were brought by Subhadra to accompany Marthanda Varma, Parameswaran Pillai and Ramayyan disguised as menials.

Other Characters 

 Unnamed Eldest Lad – The one who brings the Hakkim's message note to the palace and deliver it to Parameswaran Pillai.

Family of Thirumukhathu Pillai 
 Unnamed Mother (Deceased) – Mother of Subhadra from the relationship with Thirumukhathu Pillai. She is the maternal niece of Kudamon Pillai.
 Unnamed Sister (Deceased) – Daughter of Thirumukhathu Pillai and the little sister of Ananthapadmanabhan. Padmanabhan Thambi wanted to marry her; which Ananthapadmanabhan opposed as he was against the proposal.
 Unnamed Mother / Thirumukhathe Akkan – Mother of Ananthapadmanabhan and spouse of Thirumukhathu Pillai.

Channars 
 Channars of Palm-plant – The Channar people at the palm-tree plant, where prince Marthanda Varma enquires about any nearby house of Nairs, while escaping from Charottu palace.
 Channars (50 men) – The Channar people of 50 numbers who got killed by men of Thambi as per his order to nab the mad Channan.
 Channars – People of Channar clan who assembles after the slaughter of 50 Channars by the men of Thambi. Mad Channan persuades them to aid him in providing defense at Mangoikkal house.
 Ozhukkan – One of the Channars.
 Koppilan – One of the Channars.
 Podiyan – One of the Channars.
 Nandan – One of the Channars.
 Rakithan – One of the Channars.
 Suppiramaniyan – One of the Channars.
 Ponnan – One of the Channars.
 Poothathan – One of the Channars.

Paramours of Padmanabhan Thambi 
 Unnamed Female-Deposer – A prostitute who gives false statement against prince Marthanda Varma on the murder of Ananthapadmanabhan as conspired by Sundarayyan and Padmanabhan Thambi, for whom she is a soubrette.
 Sivakami – Paramour of Padmanabhan Thambi.
 Woman of Ezhamkudi – Mistress of Padmanabhan Thambi.
 Kamalam – Paramour of Padmanabhan Thambi.

Aiders of Padmanabhan Thambi 
 Lancers of Velu Kurup – The 14 lancers led by Velu Kurup to Charottu palace. Two of them are killed by the arrows shot by Chulliyil Chadachi Marthandan Pillai.
 Kutti Pillai – One of the 14 lancers led by Velu Kurup to Charottu palace.
 Pappanachar – One of the 14 lancers led by Velu Kurup to Charottu palace.
 Chatayan Pillai – One of the 14 lancers led by Velu Kurup to Charottu palace.
 Ooli Nair – One of the 14 lancers led by Velu Kurup to Charottu palace.
 Parappan Nair – One of the 14 lancers led by Velu Kurup to Charottu palace.
 Unnamed (Vicharippukaran) – The manager of Padmanabahan Thambi at Padmanabhapuram palace.
 Unnamed Servants – Servants of Padmanabahan Thambi at Padmanabhapuram palace.
 Unnamed Servant – The one who informs about the theft happened at the house of Sundarayyan's wife, Anantham.
 Unnamed Fighters – The lancers who disguised as Mangoikkal men and tried to attack Thirumukhathu Pillai.
 Unnamed Guards – Royal lancers who support Padmanabhan Thambi and are deployed at Chembakassery under Chembakassery Mootha Pillai, who takes them back to Padmanabhan Thambi following the order of Valiya Sarwadhikaryakkar to report back to palace after which, Thambi relieve them from duty.
 Unnamed (Pattakkar) – The messengers in Pathan outfits who accompany Padamanabhan Thambi at Thiruvananthapuram.
 Unnamed Accomplices – The accomplices in domestic outfits who accompany Padamanabhan Thambi at Thiruvananthapuram.
 Unnamed Householders – The householders, who convene at the house of Padmanabhan Thambi for the meeting on the night in which Shankarachar is killed.
 Unnamed Landlords – The landlords, who convene at the house of Padmanabhan Thambi for the meeting on the night in which Shankarachar is killed.
 Unnamed (Pattakkaran) – The one who informs Padmanabhan Thambi about the arrival of Chulliyil Chadachi Marthandan Pillai at Valiya Nalukettu.
 Unnamed (Pattakkaran) – The one who informs Padmanabhan Thambi about the demise of king, Rama Varma.
 Unnamed Servants – The servants who provide foot massage and air wampish to Padamanabhan Thambi at his residence in Thiruvananthapuram.
 Unnamed Guards – The fighters who serve at Padmanabhan Thambi's residence in Thiruvananthapuram as guards.
 Lancers and Nairs (200 men) – A group of lancers and Nairs led by Velu Kurup in search of Marthanda Varma and finally attacks Mangoikkal house.  The remaining 12 lancers of Velu Kurup are included.
 A group of 150 men are deployed at nearby locations of Mangoikkal house by Velu Kurup, later led to Mangoikkal
 A group of 20 men are led on the main path to Mangoikkal.
 Lancers and Nairs (150 men) – A group of lancers and Nairs send by Padmanabhan Thambi to aid Velu Kurup for the attack at Mangoikkal
 One of the lancers reaches back to Thambi to inform about defeat at Mangoikkal.
 Nanjinadu Fighters – The fighters of 500 numbers including Marava people from Nanchinadu led by Raman Thambi.

Aiders of Ettuveettil Pillais 
 Servants of Ettuveettil Pillais – The servants of Ettuveettil Pillais; who are creating mutiny at palace gate.
 Unnamed Servant of Kudamon Pillai – The one who arranges the particulars for the oath at council by Ettuveettil Pillais.
 Unnamed Servants – The servants of Kazhakkoottathu Pillai; who tricks Mangoikkal Kurup and later put him under detention.
 Guards of Kazhakkoottathu Pillai – Guards at Sree Pandarathu house. Ananthapadmanabhan disguised as mad Channan drugs them to get the keys to dungeon in order to rescue Mangoikkal Kurup.

Men of Mangoikkal 
 Unnamed Parayan – A Parayan lad who gets caught by Velu Kurup, who realizes about Marthanda Varma at Mangoikkal from him.
 Servant of Mangoikkal Kurup – The one who rushes out to Mangoikkal martial arts school on the news about the march of attackers led by Velu Kurup.
 Servants of Mangoikkal – Four servants of Mangoikkal summoned on the arrival of disguised prince Marthanda Varma and Parameswaran Pillai.
 Nairs of Mangoikkal – Eight Nairs of Mangoikkal who aid in providing defence against the attack by Velu Kurup and his men at Mangoikkal.
 Parayar Guards – The guards of Parayar clan at Mangoikkal house.
 Men from Mangoikkal Kalari – The fighters of 200 numbers from the martial arts school of Mangoikkal. They defeat the men of Velu Kurup.
 Fighters of Mangoikkal – Fighters of 300 numbers led by nephews of Mangoikkal, but are defeated by Venganoor Pillai and his men.
 More than 100 fighters from the above are escaped with nephews and re-enter the capital and camp at Manakkadu.
 Unnamed Servant – The servant who accompanies Mangoikkal Kurup to Thiruvananthapuram.

Pathan people 
 Ayisha (Deceased) – Mother of Fathima, Nuradeen and Zulaikha.
 Unnamed Brother (Deceased) – Hakkim's younger brother and father of Fathima, Nuradeen and Zulaikha.
 The Pathan merchants and their team encamped at Thiruvananthapuram
 Unnamed Pathan Merchants – The lead Pathan merchants, who earlier halted at Thiruvithamkodu and are now encamped at Manakkadu, other than the Hakkim and team.
 Servants of Hakkim – The Pathan servants and fighters who serve under Hakkim
 Two Servants – Two servants who carry away the wounded Ananthapadmanabhan from Panchavan forest as directed by Hakkim.
 Pathan Fighters –  The fighters who are deployed as guards to the stall of merchandise.
 Twenty of them are led to defend Raman Thambi's men by Shansudeen and Beeram Khan.

Aiders at Chembakassery 
 Unnamed (Pattakkar) – Messengers to whom Chembakassery Mootha Pillai entrusts duties on the day before the arrival of Padmanabhan Thambi.
 Servants at Chembakassery
 Unnamed Servant of Parukutty – The lady attendant who provides the book and other particulars to Parukutty.
 Unnamed (Adichuthelikkari) – The lady cleaner on whom Karthyayani Amma prevails persistently to make the surroundings clean.
 Unnamed Lady Servant – The one who is entrusted to clean the lamps.
 Tailors / Weavers – The skilled workers who arrange necessary bed sheets and curtains
 Kitchen Staff – The cooks and assistants to whom Karthyayani Amma insists to cut more vegetables for the preparation of dishes.
 Unnamed (Vaidyanmar) – Traditional medicine practitioners who come to Chembakasery to provide medication to Parukutty's illness.

Members of Palace at Thiruvananthapuram 
 Unnamed (Valiya Sawadhikaryakkar) – The chief minister of the kingdom who orders the recall of palace guards at Chembakassery.
 Unnamed Sarwadhi (Sawadhikaryakkar) – A district officer under Valiya Sawadhikaryakkar. He suspects about the actions of prince Marthanda Varma at the night in which Shankarachar and Velu Kurup are dead.
 Unnamed (Vaidyanmar) – Traditional medicine practitioners who provide medication for king Rama Varma's illness. One of them is arranged to go to Chemabakassery, as ordered by the prince, Marthanda Varma.
 Unnamed Scholars – The qualified people including priests, clergies, magicians who do their respective occult practices for extending the lifetime of king Rama Varma.
 Unnamed Cowards – The people who became courageous to talk about the pros and cons of rule of king Rama Varma
 Unnamed Special Servants – The special servants of king Rama Varma; they are honest in disclosing the pros and cons of rule of king Rama Varma.
 Unnamed Servants – King Rama Varma's servants, whose faces are languid due to the increasing illness of the king.
 Unnamed Disciples – The happy disciples of prince Marthanda Varma as the accession of their master is nearing.
 Unnamed Ministers – The ministers, who request monetary aid from the aristocratic residents.
 Unnamed Emissary – The emissary deputed by prince Marthanda Varma to Kilimanoor palace.
 Unnamed (Thirumulpadanmar) – The Thirumulpad Nair assistants who lead prince Marthanda Varma, while moving inside the palace.
 Unnamed Messengers – The messengers who are entrusted to inform the middle lords about the illness of king.
 Unnamed Accomplices – The accomplices of prince Marthanda Varma at Thekkekoyikkal. Two among them run to his aid during the final moments of Shankarachar.
 Unnamed Chamberlains – The chamberlains at palace, where they are found by Kudamon Pillai, Thambi duo and their men, while searching for Marthanda Varma.

Forces on the side of Marthanda Varma 
 Unnamed Men (500 Nos) – The supporters of Thirumukhathu Pillai and Aruveettukar, whom they followed to provide support to the prince, Marthanda Varma.
 Fighters from Kilimanoor – The fighters led by Naranayyan and later defeated by Kazhakkoottathu Pillai and his men.
 Madura Forces – The mercenaries from Madurai camped at Boothapandi, where they detain Dalawa Arumukham Pillai, due to incomplete payment of their arrears.

General People 
 Group of Civilians – The group of people who rush into the fort and are confronted by the king Rama Varma to disperse. Eight of them are dispersed only when king Rama Varma signaled them to do so.
 Unnamed Lords – The lords who visit Padmanabhan Thambi at his house in Thiruvananthapuram, to get favors from Thambi for their ventures.
 Unnamed Civilians – The people who secure their money and valuables in hidden places.
 Unnamed Residents – The residents who wish to see the end of fights and mutiny with the accession of Marthanda Varma to the throne.
 Unnamed People – The people who refrain from paying the taxes, as they believe that a change in the heir lineage is going to happen.
 Unnamed Residents – The aristocratic residents who are reluctant to provide monetary assistance to the ministers, due to the fear about the wrath of enemies of prince Marthanda Varma.
 Unnamed Women – The women who are at their respective houses and blame the prince, Marthanda Varma.
 People of Northern Provinces – The people, who aligns on the side of Ettuveettil Pillais at Chiriyankeezhu, Thiruvananthapuram, Neyyattinkara.
 People of Central Provinces – The people who are reluctant to support royal houses by providing in counter offence at Iraniyal, Kalkulam, Vilavancode.
 Unnamed Brahmins – Aged Brahmin people who are expecting favors from royal palace.
 Unnamed Nairs – Nair people who collect and store sandalwood pieces and clarified butter in stalls near to the palace.
 Unnamed Women – Matresfamilias who store enough vegetables.
 Unnamed Children – Children who are worried about losing Vishu and Onam for the next year.
 Unnamed People – The miserly people who are happy due to the probable savings going to happen with non-celebration of Vishu and Onam.
 Unnamed People – People who greet Padmanabhan Thambi, while passing by the Padmanabhapuram palace.
 Unnamed Lady – The lady, who passes by the Padmanabhapuram palace, from where Padmanabhan Thambi fantasizes that she peeks at him flirtatiously.
 Unnamed People – People who bring bunches of plantain banana to Chembakassery.

Others 
 Unnamed (House-holder) – A Nair relative of Kudamon Pillai and maternal uncle of Beeram Khan.
 Unnamed (Kottaram Vicharippukaran) – The palace manager of Charottu Palace, he works from his home.
 Unnamed Lady – The beautiful lady who marries Nuradeen.
 Unnamed Mother (Deceased) – Mother of Padmanabhan Thambi and spouse of King Rama Varma.
 Unnamed (Anjanakkaran) – A clairvoyant who affirms to Thirumukhathu Pillai about the murder of Ananthapadmanabhan by the prince Marthanda Varma through paranormal retrocognition.
 Unnamed Beauties – The court-mistresses that Sundarayyan suggests bringing from Thanjavur for Padmanabhan Thambi.
 Unnamed Lords – The middle lords, who are related to royal family.
 Unnamed Wife – The wife of Ramanamadathil Pillai, who visits her on the day of Thiruvonam.
 Unnamed Son – The son of Ramanamadathil Pillai, who visits him on the day of Thiruvonam.
 Unnamed Accomplices – Accomplices of king Marthanda Varma at Nagercoil palace, where Padmanabhan Thambi gets killed by them in a precognitive narration.
 Unnamed Man – The fiancé of Anantham prior to her relation with Sundarayyan, who tricks the former to move away.
 Unnamed (Assan) – The master who taught Mathematics to Parukutty.
 Unnamed (Pisharody) – The one who taught lyrics to Parukutty.
 Unnamed (Shasthri) – A Brahmin from a village near Madurai who becomes the father of Sundarayyan and Kodanki from the relationship with a Marava lady.
 Unnamed Marava Lady – Mother of Sundarayyan and Kodanki in a relation with a Brahmin from a village near Madurai.
 Unnamed Wife – The wife of Valiya Sawadhikaryakkar, she is in bed rest post the parturition.
 Unnamed Niece – The niece of Valiya Sawadhikaryakkar, she is in a state of ill health.
 Unnamed Daughter – The daughter of Valiya Sawadhikaryakkar, she is pregnant.
 Unnamed Families – The families who were converted to Islam during the conquest of Mughols in Travancore.
 Unnamed Relatives – The relatives who visit Chembakassery on hearing about the illness of Parukkutty.
 Unnamed Friends – The family friends, who visit Chembakassery on hearing about the illness of Parukkutty.
 Unnamed Father (Deceased) – The former care taker of armory at Chembakassery and the late father of Shanku Assan. He wrote the astrological notes on Parukutty, after her birth.
 Unnamed Mother (Deceased) – The former servant at Chembakassery and the late mother of Shanku Assan.
 Unnamed (Ayanmar) – The masters to whom the horoscope of Parukutty was shown for the possibility of any alternative to the natal astrological note written by the father of Shanku Assan.
 Ahor Namboothirippadu – The Akavoor Namboothiri about whom Velu Kurup mentions as the one who evoked protection to his armor shield by chanting of seventy million Dhanwantharam.
 Unnamed Shasthris – The Shasthri Brahmins of Kancheepuram. Hakkim with his excellence in treatment is considered as an incarnation of Vagbhata by them.
 Arcot Nawab – The Nawab of Arcot who presents Hakkim with wealth and awards.

People of Nanjinadu 
 Unnamed People of Nanjinadu – The residents of Nanjinadu; who follow the Mudaliyar lords.
 Mudaliyar Lords
 Cherakonar – A Mudaliyar lord in Nanjinadu who sides with Padmanabhan Thambi.
 Mailavanar – A Mudaliyar lord in Nanjinadu who sides with Padmanabhan Thambi.
 Vanikaraman – A Mudaliyar lord in Nanjinadu who sides with Padmanabhan Thambi.

Character relations

style="border-spacing: 4px; border: 0px solid darkgray;"
-
+ Legend
-
  
-
  
-

style="border-spacing: 4px; border: 0px solid darkgray; text-align: left; line-height: 90%; stroke: red;"
-
  
 Matrilineal family 
-
  
 Patrilineal family  
-
  
 Family of lineage unknown
-
  
  Family of Collateral descent
-
  
 Character gets killed during the time-line of novel, Marthandavarma
-
  
 Active character during the timeline of novel, Marthandavarma
-
  
 Character obtains natural death during the time-line of novel, Marthandavarma
-

style="border-spacing: 4px; border: 0px solid darkgray; text-align: left; line-height: 90%;"

 

 
 

|-
|style="text-align: left;"|Lineage-graph-notes

Allusions to personalities in legends, history and real life

Marthanda Varma 

Marthanda Varma, who is distinctively known as Anizham Thirunal Marthanda Varma, ascended to the throne of Venad in 1729, and thereafter expanded the kingdom to form the state of Travancore. At the age of one, he lost his parents among whom, his father was a Kilimanoor Koithampuran who, died of severe fever and his mother was adapted to Venad royal family during the period of Umayamma Rani from Kolathunadu. The novel does not give any explicit references to the hereditary roots of Marthanda Varma. In the novel, he refers king Rama Varma as his maternal uncle and refers Kilimanoor Koithampuran, who sacrificed his life for saving the little prince Karthika Thirunal Rama Varma from the plans of Ramanamadathil Pillai, as elder brother.

Thambi Duo 
Thambi duo or Thambimar or Thambi brothers refers to the two sons of king Rama Varma. In the royal edicts, Mathilakam Records, the sons of king Rama Varma are mentioned as Kunchu Thambi and Ilaya Thambi for elder and younger brothers respectively; also mentioned that, they had a paterfamilias named Kumara Pillai. P. Shangoony Menon stated their names as Papu Thambi and Raman Thambi in the History of Travancore from the Earliest Times, whereas in The Sketch of Progress of Travancore, Dewan Nanoo Pillai stated that they were commonly known as Coonju Thambimar and their names are Pulpu Thumbi and Raman Thambi. In the folk songs and ballads the elder one is mentioned as Valiya Thambi and younger one is Kunju Thambi, and also mentions that their mother's name as Abhirami or Kittanathalamma and they have a younger sister named Kochumani Thanka or Kochu Madamma. In the novel the elder brother is Pappu Thambi alias Padmanabhan Thambi, whereas the younger brother is Raman Thambi. In the biography of author, C. V. Raman Pillai, it is mentioned that the caretaker of the author in his childhood, Kesavan Thambi Karyakkar had two sons named Padmanabhan Thambi and Raman Thambi, with whom author had grown up. The novel mentions about Padmanabhan Thambi's mother as deceased during the timeline of the novel and did not link her to Raman Thambi, about whom Padmanabhan Thambi raises the concern of being upset, if he is to claim the throne through lineal descent system implying that Raman Thambi is equally eligible like him for the throne as possibly born to a different mother.

Ananthan / Ananthapadmanabhan

Ananthapadmanabhan was a warrior and expert in martial arts who played a pivotal role in defending the plans of conspirators against Marthanda Varma. According to Prof. N. Krishna Pillai and Prof. Anandakkuttan Nair, Ananthapadmanabhan served in the Travancore forces somewhere after Kollavarsham 904 (Gregorian Calendar: 1729) and he was awarded with royal properties in Kollavarsham 920 (1745), where as  according to Dr. A. P. Ibrahim Kunju the award happened in 1748.  He was born as Ananthan Perumal to Thanumalaya Perumal and Lakshmi Devi in Sanror clan, and was affectionately addressed as Padmanabhan by his maternal uncle. In the novel, the author did not affirm the caste of Ananthapadmanabhan, by not providing any details of his mother and he is not been referred as a Pillai or Nair throughout the novel, even though he is described as the son of Thirumukhathu Pillai. The name of character's love interest in the novel, Parukkutty alias Parvathi Amma is in reminiscence of the name of real life of spouse of Ananthan, Parvathi Ammal. The character is being referred as Ananthapadmanabha Pillai in the ballads about Thambi brothers and referred as Ananthan in other ballads such as Aṉantan Pāṭṭŭ and Ōṭṭan Katai. In the novel, alter ego of the character named Shamsudeen dwells with the Pathans at Manacaud. The author of the novel, C. V. Raman Pillai happened to go for an expedition to Hyderabad following a heatbreak due to unfulfilled love. In Hyderabad, the author was staying with some Muslim people and was suggested to marry a Muslim lady after getting converted to Islam. The characterization of Shamsudeen is in resemblance with the experiences of the author.

Rama Varma 

Rama Varma was the ruler of Venad during Kollavarsham 899-903. He is a descendant of Kolathunadu kingdom, from where he was adopted to Travancore royal family during the period of Umayamma Rani. He was adopted along with Unni Kerala Varma and other two ladies, among whom one became the mother of Marthanda Varma. P. Shangoony Menon and V. Nagam Aiya state that the four members were provided from Kolathunadu to Travancore family on the request of Umayamma Rani. T. K. Velu Pillai states that they were adopted by Ravi Varma in Kollavarsham 863.  Rama Varma is the father of Thambimar and he succeeded his brother and ascend to the throne of Venad in Kollavarsham 899.  According to T. K. Velu Pillai, Rama Varma was a weak ruler and his reign led to the disorganization of political life in Travancore. He died due to short illness in 1729. In the novel he is presented as bedridden due to illness and dies during the story.

Karthika Thirunal Rama Varma 

Karthika Thirunal Rama Varma also known as Dharmaraja ascend to the throne of Travancore in Kollavarsham 933 succeeding Marthanda Varma. He was born in Kollavarsham 899 as the son of a Kilimanoor Thampuran and Attingal Queen, who was adopted as a princess to Travancore royal family from Kolathunadu during the period of Ravi Varma. The novel presents only in his childhood age.

Queen of Attingal 
Senior Queen of Attingal, who was the mother of Karthika Thirunal Rama Varma. She was adopted to Travancore royal family from Kolathunadu kingdom in Kollavarsham 893 during the period of king Ravi Varma. She gave birth to Karthika Thirunal Rama Varma from the alliance with a lord of Kilmanoor in Kollavarsham 899. In the novel, she is being referred as an unnamed royal mother only along with her son, Rama Varma.

Kilimanoor Thampurans 

Kilimanoor Thampurans are the lords of Kilimanoor house, which is situated north to the Thriruvananthapuram. According to V. Nagam Aiya, the house of Kilimanoor has been loyally and honorably connected with Travancore royal family, as the male members of family are chosen for alliance with the queens of Travancore. In the novel two lords of Kilimanoor are mentioned; one referred as Kilimanoor Kerala Varma and another as Kilimanoor Koithampuran among whom, former is the one who sacrifices his life in defending against the plans to endanger the little prince Karthika Thirunal Rama Varma and the mother, whereas the latter one guards the little prince and mother during the attempt to coup d'état by Thambi brothers and Ettuveettil Pillai's at Thiruvananthapuram.

Relationships of royal personalities

style="border-spacing: 4px; border: 0px solid darkgray;"
-
+ Legend
-
 
-
 
-

style="border-spacing: 4px; border: 0px solid darkgray; text-align: left; line-height: 90%; stroke: red;"
-
 
 Matrilineal family 
-
 
 Patrilineal family  
-
 
 Family of lineage unknown
-
 
  Family of Collateral descent
-
 
 Only mentioned in legends and ballads
-
 
 Ascended to the throne
-

|-
|style="text-align: left;"|Lineage-graph-notes:

Ettuveettil Pillais / Ettuveetil Pillamar 

Ettuveettil Pillais or Ettuveettil Pillamar refers to the chiefs of eight noble Nair families in the yesteryear Venad (Travancore). They were one of the main groups who conspired against the accession of Marthanda Varma. In the royal edicts, one of the Ettuveetiil Pillais mentioned in the novel, Kudamon Pillai is referred to in one of the groups of conspirators prevailed against Marthanda Varma. According to Dr. P. Venugopalan, Ettuveettil Pillais mentioned in the novel are based on the verses from Sree Veera Marthandavarmacharitham Aattakatha, which was published during 1883–1884 by P. Govinda Pillai. In the novel except for Thirumadathil Pillai, all other titles of Ettuveettil Pillais are in reminiscence of the references made in the verses, an extract from which is also given as an epigraph to the eleventh chapter of the novel. P. Shangoony Menon stated the eight titles of Ettuveettil Pillais. V. Nagam Aiya states that their titles are the names of the villages they headed and not their family names. According to P. Shangunny Menon, Madambies or Madampimar, the petty chiefs who were confederates of Ettuveettil Pillais, by whom the former group were influenced to become a powerful combination with the latter group. In the Malayalam translation of History of Travancore from the Earliest Times, C. K. Kareem claims that Ettuveettil Pillais were gradually grown as Madambies, even though it conflicts with the source material. Dewan Nanoo Pillai refers that Madampimars and Ettuveettil Pillais were the hereditary enemies of Marthanda Varma. T. K. Velu Pillai claims that Ettuveettil Pillais are mistaken for the Madathil Pillais, who were entrusted to manage the properties of six madams or areas; and that the chiefs or leaders were Ettuveettil Madambimar and not Ettuveettil Pillamar. He also claims that Kulathur Pillai and Kazhakkoottathu Pillai were mentioned as Pillais of six houses including the name of a Tamilian in the royal edicts, even though there are no such explicit informations in the referred royal edicts, Mathilakam Records – M. Doc. CXXX. Dr. Ibrahim Kunju cites the references of conspiracy by Pillais in Letters to Tellicherry, the British records. In the novel, Ettuveettil Pillais play as main supporters of Padmanabhan Thambi by framing and executing lethal plans against Marthanda Varma, and one of the Pillais, Kudamon Pillai is killed by Ananthapadmanabhan.

Arukkoottathil Pillais 
Arukkoottathil Pillais or Arukoottathil Pillamar refer to members of wealthy noble Nair families prevailed in the yesteryear Travancore. In the royal edicts, it is mentioned that, a set of six members of them are found among the conspirators during the period of Marthanda Varma. In the novel, they are presented as a Thambi clan, Aruveettukar, who stood along with Thirumukhathu Pillai.

Ramayyan 

Ramayyan or Rama Iyen, better known as Ramayyan Dalawa was the prime minister of Travancore during Kollavarsham 912-931, the period in which the most successful conquests under Marthanda Varma were accomplished. He joined the Travancore ministerial service as a Kuṭṭi Paṭṭar (minor Brahmin assistant), later got promoted as under secretary (Rayasom) and then state secretary following the accession of Marthanda Varma, who made him Dalawa after the demise of Thanu Pillai. In the novel, he is presented as a supporter and adviser to Marthanda Varma, whom he accompanies during the final coup by Thambi brothers. It is also mentioned in the novel that Ramayyan was promoted for Rayasom work by king Rama Varma.

Narayanayyan 
Narayanayyan or Naraayana Iyen was the assistant of Ramayyan, while the latter was state secretary. He assisted Ramanyyan in the deputation to explain and convince Azhagappa Mudaliyar regarding the accession tradition and respective stratum prevailed in Travancore. In the novel he is presented as a royal servant under whom, the forces from Kilimanooor are arranged in support to Marthanda Varma.

Arumukham Pillai 
Arumukham Pillai was the acting Dalawa of Venad during Kollavarsham 901-903, and became Dalawa after the accession of Marthanda Varma, to continue in his post till 909. He was once detained by mercenary forces from Madurai due to incomplete payment of their arrears against their service as additional forces to Travancore. The novel presents only his detention by Madurai forces at Boothapandi.

Mangottu Assan 
Mangottu Assan is the head of a family at Mancode and one of the masters of 108 Kalaries (martial arts schools) prevailed in Venad. In the ballad Ōṭṭan Katai, it is mentioned that his house was burned down by Kunchukkoottam (men of Kunchu Thambi). In the novel, he is presented as Mangoikkal Kuruppu whose house is burned down by the men of Padmanabhan Thambi, as Marthanda Varma took shelter there.

Valiya Sarwadhi Karyakkar and Sarwadhi Karyakkar 
Valiya Sarwadhi Karyakkar is the title for administrative head of Travancore and Sarwadhi Karyakkar is the title for a district officer under Valiya Sarwadhi Karyakkar. During the period of king Rama Varma, Valiya Sarwadhi Karyakkar was under the direct orders of king. In the novel, Valiya Sarwadhi Karyakkar is mentioned to have a wife who is on rest, post the delivery of a newborn, a daughter who is pregnant for ten months, and a niece who is ill. Sarwadhi Karyakkar in the novel is one of those people, who suspects about the actions of Marthanda Varma during the night in which, Shankarachar is killed.

Chadachi Marthandan 
According to Dr. P. Venugopalan, Chadachi Marthandan is mentioned in the legends as the one who becomes the supporter of Marthanda Varma, even though earlier he was with the conspirators. Dr. N. Ajithkumar notes the references in the legends that the house of Chadachi Marthandan was located at Chulliyur. In the novel he is presented as Chulliyil Chadachi Marthandan Pillai, who is a servant of Thirumukhathu Pillai and later take sides with the Ettuveettil Pillais.

Madurai Forces 
Madurai forces are the mercenaries sent to Travancore as per the agreement of king Rama Varma and Madurai Nayaks of Thiruchirapalli in Kollavarsham 901. T. K. Velu Pillai argues that, there could not be any such agreement, but agrees with detention of Arumukham Pillai by the mercenaries. In the novel they are presented as camped at Boothapandi, where Dalawa Arumukham Pillai is kept under detention.

Subardra, one of the pivotal characters of the novel is based on the character of author's wife, Bhageerithi Amma. The character of Thirumukhathu Pillai is based on the caretaker and patron of the author, Nangoikkal Kesavan Thambi, who was a Karyakkar (Administrative head of a Taluk) in Travancore. In the novel, there is reference to an Arcot Nawab, who gifted Hakkim for the latter's medical excellence. There is also reference to a namboothiripad of Akavoor family, and presented as famous for sorcery meant for protective measures against bad luck and danger. There is also a reference to an unnamed Sultan of Turkey, with whom the character of Ugran Kazhakkoottathu Pillai is being compared with. There is a reference to the look of members of Tiruvallā Pōṯimār (Brahmins of ten houses at Thiruvalla); with which the attire of prince Marthanda Varma at Charottu palace is being compared with.

Characters recurring in sequels 
The characters of Marthandavarma novel, Ananthapadmanabhan , Kochuvelu, Ilaya Tampuran, and Ramanamathil Pillai's unnamed son, continue to be characters in Dharmaraja novel as Valiyapadathalavan, Karthika Tirunnal Ramavarma or the title character, and Chanthrakaran respectively. In the sequel to the Dharmaraja novel, Ramarajabahadur, Chanthrakaran and Karthika Thirunnal Ramavarma continue as Manikyagaundan and the title character respectively.

Complex relationships of characters 

style="border-spacing: 4px; border: 0px solid darkgray;"
-
+ Legend
-
  
-
  
-

style="border-spacing: 4px; border: 0px solid darkgray; text-align: left; line-height: 90%; stroke: red;"
-
  
 Matrilineal family 
-
  
 Patrilineal family  
-
  
 Family of lineage unknown
-
  
  Family of Collateral descent
-
  
 Character gets killed during the time-line of novel, Marthandavarma
  
 Character gets killed during the time-line of novel, Dharmaraja
-
  
 Active character during the timeline of novel, Marthandavarma
  
 Active character during the timeline of novel, Dharmaraja 
-
  
 Character obtains natural death during the time-line of novel, Marthandavarma
  
 Character obtains natural death during the time-line of novel, Dharmaraja
-
  
 Character appears in  novels, Marthandavarma, Dharmaraja, and Ramarajabahadur
  
 Character gets killed during the time-line of novel, Ramarajabahadur
-
  
 Character appears only in  the novels, Marthandavarma, and Dharmaraja
  
 Active character during the timeline of novel, Ramarajabahadur 
-
  
 Character appears only in  the novels, Dharmaraja, and Ramarajabahadur
  
 Character obtains natural death during the time-line of novel, Ramarajabahadur
-

style="border-spacing: 4px; border: 0px solid darkgray; text-align: left; line-height: 90%;"

 

 
 

|-
|style="text-align: left;"|Lineage-graph-notes

Notes

References

Bibliography

 
 
 
 
 
 
 
 
 
 
 
 
 
 
 
 
 
 
 
 
 
 
 
 
 
 
 
 
 
 

Lists of literary characters